Fairfield Township is one of fifteen townships in DeKalb County, Indiana. As of the 2010 census, its population was 1,368 and it contained 691 housing units.

History
Fairfield Township was founded in 1844.

The Maria and Franklin Wiltrout Polygonal Barn was added to the National Register of Historic Places in 1993.

Geography
Indian Lake, Lower Story Lake and Upper Story Lake are in this township.

Unincorporated towns
 Fairfield Center

Adjacent townships
 Salem Township, Steuben County (north)
 Steuben Township, Steuben County (northeast)
 Smithfield Township (east)
 Grant Township (southeast)
 Richland Township (south)
 Wayne Township, Noble County (west)
 Milford Township, LaGrange County (northwest)

Major highways
  U.S. Route 6
  Indiana State Road 4
  Indiana State Road 327

References
 
 United States Census Bureau cartographic boundary files

External links

 Indiana Township Association
 United Township Association of Indiana

Townships in DeKalb County, Indiana
Townships in Indiana
1844 establishments in Indiana
Populated places established in 1844